Ivor Abrahams  (10 January 1935 – 6 January 2015) was a British sculptor, ceramicist and print maker best known for his polychrome sculptures and his stylised prints of garden scenes. His career long exploration of new subject matter, novel techniques and materials made his art dealer, James Mayor, describe him as Europe's equivalent of Robert Rauschenberg.

Early life
Ivor Abrahams was born 10 January 1935 in Wigan, Lancashire to a Jewish family, the eldest of 2 children. Both parents were born in Manchester area - Ray (Rachael) née Kalisky / Kay and Harry (Hyman) Abrahams - but all four grandparents came from eastern Europe.  He studied sculpture at Saint Martin's School of Art under Frank Martin and Anthony Caro 1952–54, and Camberwell School of Art under Karel Vogel and Martin Bloch 1954–57. In 1957, he became apprentice to the Fiorini Bronze Foundry, and went on to work as a display artist for Adel Rootstein.

Work
His first show, in 1960, was at the Portal Gallery with Peter Blake. Through Eduardo Paolozzi, he was included in the landmark 1961 ICA exhibition 26 Young Sculptors,  together with Phillip King and Maurice Agis, friends from the St Martin's days.

By the late 1960s Abrahams had found inspiration in the imagery of domestic gardens. As well as bronze, he started using new material for his work, nylon flocking, pre-vulcanized latex, styrene and plastics. After a solo show at the Richard Feigen Gallery in New York in 1970, he established his international reputation with a major museum show at the Kolnisher Kunstverein Cologne in 1973. In 1975, he met James Mayor who invited him to show the following year at the Mayor Gallery, thus beginning an association which continued till his death.

Abrahams' print output includes his garden series and suites celebrating Edmund Burke and Edgar Allan Poe showcased in a Royal Academy exhibition in 2010. His body of prints was published by Bernard Jacobson who regularly exhibited his work in London and the US. In 1982, Bryan Robertson organised an exhibition of the sculptures at the Warwick Arts Trust and in 1984 he was invited to mount his first sculpture retrospective at the Yorkshire Sculpture Park.

Abrahams' post-Cubist architectural structures of the 90s resulted in a commission by the Goodwood Sculpture Park and the purchase of the bronze Head of the Stairs by the Royal Borough of Kensington & Chelsea.

In the 2000s a series of owls and cockerels, using various media, including enamel on steel epoxy resin and decal, culminated in the 2005 Mayor Gallery exhibition 'A Parliament of Owls'. 2007 saw a mini retrospective entitled The Four Seasons of Ivor Abrahams at One Canada Square in Canary Wharf. In 2008 the Henry Moore Institute mounted an exhibition of early work untitled By Leafy Ways showing the 1972 film of the same name, which prompted a reintroduction of the Garden image. In 2012, a retrospective at the Royal West of England Academy was accompanied by an Andrew Lambirth monograph: Eden and Other Suburbs, the Life and Work of Ivor Abrahams.

Selected public collections

UK
 Aberdeen Art Gallery
 Arnolfini Gallery, Bristol
 Arts Council of Great Britain
 British Council, London
 British Film Institute
 Falmouth Art Gallery
 Fitzwilliam Museum, Cambridge
 Leeds Art Gallery
 Middlesbrough Institute of Modern Art
 Royal Collection, London
 Tate Gallery, London
 Victoria and Albert Museum, London
 Walker Art Gallery, Liverpool

Europe
 Bibliothèque nationale de France
 Boijmans Museum, Rotterdam
 Strasbourg Museum of Modern and Contemporary Art

US
 Dallas Museum of Art
 Denver Art Museum, Colorado
 Museum of Art Fort Lauderdale, Florida
 Metropolitan Museum of Art, New York
 Menil Collection, Houston
 Minneapolis Institute of Art
 Museum of Modern Art, New York
 Vassar College

References

Sources

External links
 Ivor Abrahams Official site
 Abrahams at the Tate Gallery
 Abrahams at the British Council
 Ivor Abrahams exhibitions at the Mayor Gallery
 Ivor Abrahams exhibitions at the Bernard Jacobson Gallery
 Abrahams on ArtNet
 

1935 births
2015 deaths
Contemporary sculptors
English contemporary artists
English Jews
English male sculptors
English printmakers
English sculptors
Royal Academicians